Wharton Tiers (born 1953, in Philadelphia) is an American audio engineer, record producer, drummer and percussionist.

Biography 
After receiving a diploma from Villanova University (Radnor Township, Delaware County, Pennsylvania), he moved to New York City in 1976 and was part of the No Wave scene.

As an audio engineer and record producer, he has worked on projects such as Sonic Youth, Glenn Branca, Das Damen, Helmet, Dinosaur Jr, White Zombie, Quicksand, An Albatross, The Dentists, Unrest, and Gumball. To date he has produced and recorded over 200 LPs and CDs, including Helmet's Meantime, for which he received a gold record in 1993.

He is also known as a percussionist and drummer for Theoretical Girls,  Laurie Anderson, and his own Wharton Tiers Ensemble.

Tiers started two groups which played his own compositions: A Band, which disbanded in 1980, and Glorious Strangers, which released a self-titled LP in 1984. Since then he has continued to compose and write many different styles of music, including solo piano, synth based instrumentals, opera, and symphonic works.

A CD of instrumentals for massed guitars by the Wharton Tiers Ensemble, Brighter Than Life, came out in April 1996, and the follow-up, Twilight Of The Computer Age, was released at the end of 1999. A new Ensemble LP, Freedom Now!, was released in March 2013 on Fun City NYC, a new record label founded by Tiers to release his music. This was followed by "A Transendance" in June 2014.

Personal discography 
 1978. Theoretical Girls – You Got Me / U.S. Millie, 7", Theoretical Records, 1978.
 1979. A Band – Lowly Worm, 7", Nancy Records, 1979.
 1980. Glorious Strangers – Why Don't You Join The Army / Media Media, 7", Theoretical Records, 1980.
 1983. Glorious Strangers – Untitled, Lp, Fun City Records, 1983.
 1996. Wharton Tiers – Brighter Than Life, CD, 1996, Atavistic records.
 1996. Glenn Branca – Songs '77-'79, CD, 1996, Atavistic records. 6 songs among 8 from Theoretical Girls.
 1999. Wharton Tiers Ensemble, The – Twilight Of The Computer Age, CD, Atavistic records, 1999.
 2002. Theoretical Girls – Theoretical Record, CD, Acute Records, 2002. Anthology of (mostly) unreleased material from the No Wave years.
 2013. Wharton Tiers Ensemble - Freedom Now!, Digital, Fun City NYC, 2013
 2013. Wharton Tiers - Mayan Nocturnes, Digital, Fun City NYC, 2013
 2013. Superduperlooper - Superduperlooper, Digital, Fun City NYC, 2013
 2013. Aurora.23 - Flash In The Universe, Digital, Fun City NYC, 2013
 2014. Wharton Tiers Ensemble - A Transendance, Digital, Fun City NYC, 2014
 2016. Wharton Tiers - Political Sonatas, Digital, Fun City NYC, 2016

References

Bibliography 
 Thurston Moore, Byron Coley, No Wave - Post-punk. Underground. New York. 1976-1980., Abrams Image, New York, 2008, 143 p.,

External links 
 Biography on his personal page.
 Lists of production and engineering credits with the Fun City Studios and The Kennel Recording studio.
 Wharton Tiers's Discography on Discogs.

1953 births
Living people
Villanova University alumni
No wave
American percussionists
Record producers from Pennsylvania
American audio engineers
Musicians from Philadelphia
Engineers from Pennsylvania
Atavistic Records artists